is a former Japanese football player.

Playing career
Sugahara was born in Otsu on June 14, 1981. After graduating from Shizuoka Gakuen High School, he moved to Brazil and joined Mirassol in 2000. In 2001, he returned to Japan and joined J1 League club Kashiwa Reysol. Although he debuted in 2002, he could hardly play in the match. In 2003, he moved to J1 club Vissel Kobe. However he could hardly play in the match. In 2004, he moved to J2 League club Sagan Tosu. However he could hardly play in the match. In 2005, he moved to Japan Football League (JFL) club Ehime FC. Although he could not play many matches, the club won the champions and was promoted to J2 end of 2005 season. In 2006, he moved to Regional Leagues club Zweigen Kanazawa. He played many matches and many goals. In 2007, he moved to Regional Leagues club Grulla Morioka. He played many matches and scored many goals in 2 seasons. In 2009, he moved to JFL club TDK (later Blaublitz Akita). He played many matches in 2 seasons. In 2011, he moved to JFL club Sony Sendai. However he could not play many matches. In 2012, he moved to JFL club Hoyo Oita. However he could not play many matches. In 2013, he moved to JFL club Blaublitz Akita again for the first time in 3 years and played many matches. In 2014, he moved to newly was promoted to J3 League club, Grulla Morioka for the first time in 6 years. He retired end of 2014 season.

Club statistics

References

External links

1981 births
Living people
Association football people from Shiga Prefecture
Japanese footballers
Japanese expatriate footballers
J1 League players
J2 League players
Japan Football League players
Kashiwa Reysol players
Vissel Kobe players
Sagan Tosu players
Ehime FC players
Zweigen Kanazawa players
Iwate Grulla Morioka players
Blaublitz Akita players
Sony Sendai FC players
Verspah Oita players
Association football forwards